Sir Ganga Ram Hospital may refer to:

 Sir Ganga Ram Hospital (India), Delhi, India
 Sir Ganga Ram Hospital (Pakistan), Lahore, Pakistan